Craig's Wife is a 1928 American silent drama film directed by William C. deMille and starring Irene Rich, Warner Baxter and Virginia Bradford. It was based on the 1925 play Craig's Wife by George Kelly. Subsequent film adaptations followed in 1936 as Craig's Wife and 1950 as Harriet Craig. It is now considered a lost film.

The film's sets were designed by the art director Edward C. Jewell.

Cast
 Irene Rich as Mrs. Craig  
 Warner Baxter as Walter Craig  
 Virginia Bradford as Ethel  
 Carroll Nye as John Fredericks  
 Lilyan Tashman as Mrs. Passmore  
 George Irving as Mr. Passmore  
 Jane Keckley as Miss Austen  
 Mabel Van Buren as Mrs. Frazer  
 Ethel Wales as Eliza  
 Rada Rae as Mary 
 Mary Emery

References

Bibliography
 Goble, Alan. The Complete Index to Literary Sources in Film. Walter de Gruyter, 1999.

External links

1928 films
1928 drama films
Silent American drama films
Films directed by William C. deMille
American silent feature films
1920s English-language films
American black-and-white films
Lost American films
Pathé Exchange films
1928 lost films
Lost drama films
1920s American films